Theli may refer to:
 Theli (dragon), the name of the great dragon according to the Sefer Yetzirah
 Theli (album), album released in 1996 by symphonic metal band Therion

See also 
 The li (disambiguation)